Juan Ignacio Amoroso Zirpel (born 8 July 1997) is a field hockey player from Chile.

Personal life
Amoroso has a younger cousin, Agustín, who has also represented Chile in field hockey.

Career

Los Diablos
Amoroso made his senior debut for Chile in 2015 during a test event for the Summer Olympics in Rio de Janeiro.

Since his debut, Amoroso has been a regular inclusion in the national squad. He has medalled with the team on numerous occasions, including silver at the South American Games in 2018 and 2022, as well as the 2022 Pan American Cup.

In 2022, he was named in the PAHF's Elite Team for the first time.

Junior national team
Juan Amoroso made his debut for the Chile U–21 team in 2015. The following year he won a bronze medal with the team at the Pan American Junior Championship in Toronto.

References

External links

1997 births
Living people
Chilean male field hockey players
Male field hockey midfielders
21st-century Chilean people
South American Games silver medalists for Chile
South American Games medalists in field hockey
Competitors at the 2018 South American Games
Competitors at the 2022 South American Games
2023 Men's FIH Hockey World Cup players